Antonín Šváb Sr. (c. 1932–2014) was an international speedway rider from Czechoslovakia.

Speedway career 
Antonín Šváb Sr. was an Individual Ice Speedway World Championship world champion winning the 1970 Individual Ice Speedway World Championship.

He died in 2014.

World final appearances

Individual Ice World Championship
 1966 -  2 rounds - 3rd - 39pts
 1967 -  3 rounds - 4th - 43pts
 1968 -  2 rounds - 5th - 44pts
 1969 -  Inzell - 4th - 12pts
 1970 -  Nässjö - 1st - 15pts
 1972 -  Nässjö - 2nd - 14pts
 1973 -  Inzell - 10th - 13pts

World Longtrack Championship
 1968  Mühldorf (7th) 10pts
 1972  Mühldorf (6th) 14pts

Family
His son Antonín Šváb Jr. was also a Czech international speedway rider.

References 

1930s births
2014 deaths
Year of birth uncertain
Czech speedway riders